Mindrum railway station was a stone built railway station serving the hamlet of Mindrum and the surrounding villages in Northumberland. It was on the Alnwick to Cornhill Branch which ran from Alnwick to Cornhill Junction on the Kelso line near Coldstream.

History

Authorised in 1882 the Cornhill Branch was built to link the farming communities of north Northumberland with the market town of Alnwick and link the North Eastern Railway's Kelso line to its Alnwick Branch. The line had difficulty attracting passengers as many of the stations were some distance from the communities they served. Increased bus competition in the 1920s led to passenger trains being withdrawn on 22 September 1930 although the service resumed briefly during the Second World War to serve RAF Milfield near .

After a severe storm in 1949 washed away a bridge north of Ilderton station British Railways who had recently taken over the line decided that the volume of traffic along the line did not warrant replacing it. This coupled with an infrequent service caused the line to go further into decline and the section from Alnwick to Ilderton closed on 2 March 1953 with the other section and Mindrum station following suit on 29 March 1965.

Services

Present day

The station building is a private residence.

References

External links
 Mindrum station on northumbrian-railways.co.uk
 Mindrum station on Disused Stations
 Mindrum station on navigable 1947 O. S. map

Disused railway stations in Northumberland
Railway stations in Great Britain opened in 1887
Railway stations in Great Britain closed in 1965
Former North Eastern Railway (UK) stations
1887 establishments in England
1965 disestablishments in England